The 2011 America East men's basketball tournament was held from March 3–6, 2011 at the Chase Arena at Reich Family Pavilion in West Hartford, Connecticut. The tournament final was held on March 12 at Agganis Arena. Boston University, the highest remaining seed, defeated Stony Brook by a score of 56–54 to win its sixth America East men's basketball title. Boston U also earned an automatic bid into the 2011 NCAA tournament, where it lost in the first round to number one seed Kansas.

Bracket and Results

Asterisk denotes game ended in overtime

Recap

Opening-Round
Binghamton vs UMBC: Binghamton played an impressive opening round game against UMBC in which the team made 17 three-pointers, breaking the record for the most three's in the America East tournament. Binghamton took the lead early on in the game and kept a point deferential of at least 12 points for most of the game, they went on to win by 91–65 score with a 51% FG percentage, 53% from the arc. Greer Wright led the game with 31 points, while Laurence Jolicoeur led UMBC with 11.

Quarter-finals
Stony Brook vs Albany:
Vermont vs Binghamton:
Boston.U vs New Hampshire:
Hartford vs Maine:

See also
America East Conference

References

America East Conference men's basketball tournament
2010–11 America East Conference men's basketball season